Weber Inc. is a publicly traded American manufacturer of charcoal, gas, and electric outdoor grills with related accessories. In 2004, Weber-Stephen acquired some assets of competitor Ducane at a bankruptcy sale. It also owns restaurants and publishes cookbooks. The company was family owned until it sold a majority stake to BDT Capital Partners in 2010. In 2021 it became a publicly traded company.

History

Weber-Stephen was originally incorporated on May 8, 1893 as Weber Bros. Metal Works.

In 1951, the original round charcoal kettle grill was built by George Stephen Sr., a then part-owner of the sheet metal shop in Chicago who sought to improve on the brazier he had been using to cook with at home.  The grill was produced using two sheet metal half-spheres normally used as parts of buoys built in his shop.  Shortly thereafter he began selling the invention, which he called 'George's Barbecue Kettle', for which there was considerable demand.

One of the earlier nicknames for the grill was ‘Sputnik‘.

Because the grill became so successful after he began selling it in 1952, Stephen formed the barbecue division of the Weber Brothers factory.  In the late 1950s, Stephen bought out the Weber Brothers factory and became the sole owner, devoting all his professional time to manufacturing and selling the Weber kettle.  Soon thereafter, Stephen changed the company's name to Weber-Stephen Products Co.

The Weber-Stephen company manufactures and sells outdoor electric grills, charcoal grills, gas grills, and charcoal smokers.

Weber Grill restaurants

In 1989, the company opened the first Weber Grill Restaurant in Wheeling, Illinois, but in spite of a remodeling in 2000, this location closed in 2010. As of August 2021, four additional locations are open in Lombard, Illinois (opened 1999), River North, Chicago (2002), Schaumburg, Illinois (2005), and Indianapolis (2007).

While a majority share of Weber-Stephen Products LLC was sold to BDT Capital Partners in 2010, the acquisition did not include restaurant operations. While both the restaurants and outdoor cooking equipment maintain the Weber branding, two separate companies now exist. The restaurants remain solely owned by the Stephen family.

On December 12, 2022, Weber announced that BDT Capital Partners purchased all of Weber's remaining stock for $3.7 billion. Weber's stock was then suspended and then delisted on the New York Stock Exchange.

Acquisitions

Ducane Products Co.
The Ducane Products Company began as the Ducane Brothers Metal Fabricating in 1946. It moved three years later to Little Ferry, New Jersey and manufactured warm air furnaces. In 1968, the name was changed to The Ducane Company and moved the base of operations to Barnwell, South Carolina and in 1975, they started making Ducane gas grills. Ducane filed for bankruptcy in 2003 and was partially acquired by Weber-Stephens at a bankruptcy sale in 2004 for $13.6 million.

Under Weber's leadership, Ducane marketed propane and natural gas grills through big box home improvement and specialty outdoor product stores. In an effort to revamp the Ducane brand, Weber introduced the "Ducane Stainless" (2006) exclusively through Home Depot, the "Ducane Affinity" (2007) and the "Ducane Meridian" (2007) through multiple channels.

June
In 2021, it was announced that June, a home automation company specializing in kitchen appliances including a "smart" oven, was acquired by Weber for $142.2 million. It exists as a “strategic business unit” within Weber. Co-founder Matt Van Horn is the president of June while the company's other co-founder, Nikhil Bhogal, is the senior vice president, technology and connected devices of Weber. Van Horn continued to focus on the June Oven while Bhogal works with Weber R&D programs and new products.

Initial public offering
On July 12, 2021, Weber-Stephens Products LLC announced it had filed a Form S-1 with the Securities and Exchange Commission to make a public offering of Class A Shares on the New York Stock Exchange with an expected ticker symbol WEBR. It began trading under symbol WEBR on August 5, 2021, opening at $17 per share compared to the IPO offering of $14 per share.

Publications
Weber's Art of the Grill: Recipes for Outdoor Living, Jamie Purviance and Tim Turner,  1999.
Weber's Big Book of Grilling, Jamie Purviance, Sandra S. McRae, and Tim Turner, 2001.
Weber's Art of the Grill Deck: Recipes for Outdoor Living (cards), Jamie Purviance and Tim Turner, 2002.
Weber's Real Grilling, Jamie Purviance, Mike Kempster, and Tim Turner, 2005.
Weber's Charcoal Grilling: The Art of Cooking With Live Fire, Jamie Purviance and Tim Turner, 2007.
Weber's Way to Grill: The Step-by-Step Guide to Expert Grilling, Jamie Purviance, 2009.
Weber's Complete Barbecue Book: Step-by-step Advice and Over 150 Delicious Barbecue Recipes, Jamie Purviance, 2010.
Weber's On the Grill: Chicken & Sides: Over 100 Fresh, Great Tasting Recipes, Jamie Purviance, 2010.
Weber's On the Grill: Steak & Sides: Over 100 Fresh, Great Tasting Recipes, Jamie Purviance, 2010.
Weber's Time to Grill: Get In. Get Out. Get Grilling., Jamie Purviance, 2011.
Weber's Smoke: A Guide to Smoke Cooking for Everyone and Any Grill, Jamie Purviance, 2012.
Weber's Barbecue Anytime: Over 190 Inspirational Recipes to Help You Get the Most Out of Your Barbecue, Jamie Purviance, 2012.
Weber's New Real Grilling: The ultimate cookbook for every backyard griller, Jamie Purviance, 2013.

References

External links
 

American companies established in 1893
Palatine, Illinois
Companies based in Cook County, Illinois
Manufacturing companies established in 1893
Manufacturing companies based in Illinois
Companies listed on the New York Stock Exchange
Cooking appliance brands
1893 establishments in Illinois
2021 initial public offerings